Anzov (also, Anzo) is a village and municipality in the Yardymli Rayon of Azerbaijan.  It has a population of 901.

References 

 
 

Populated places in Yardimli District